Xing Shizhong (September 1938 – 11 March 2019) was a general of the Chinese People's Liberation Army. He served as chief of staff and deputy commander of the Lanzhou Military Region and president of the PLA National Defence University (1995–2002). He was a member of the 15th Central Committee of the Chinese Communist Party.

Biography 
Xing was born in September 1938 in Licheng, Shandong, Republic of China. He enlisted in the People's Liberation Army (PLA) in 1953 and graduated from the PLA Nanjing Engineering Institute in 1956. He joined the Chinese Communist Party the following year. He was a classmate of Li Xinliang, who later served as commander of the Beijing Military Region.

Xing had a military career spanning 50 years. He served as an engineering officer and a regimental commander in the Guangzhou Military Region. He was considered a protege of General Zhang Wannian, and was also connected to General Fu Quanyou. He fought in the 1979 Sino-Vietnamese War, and was promoted to division commander for his performance in the war. He was later promoted to corps commander.

He served as Chief of Staff of the Lanzhou Military Region from 1985 to 1988, and was awarded the rank of major general in 1988. After 1988 he served as deputy commander of the Lanzhou MR, and attained the rank of lieutenant general in 1993. From 1995 to 2002 he served as president of the PLA National Defence University, an important position given the university's role in training top PLA officers. He was promoted to full general in March 1998.

Xing was elected to the 15th Central Committee of the Chinese Communist Party, serving from 1997 to 2002. He was also a delegate to the 7th, 8th, and 10th National People's Congresses.

Xing died in Beijing on 11 March 2019, at the age of 80.

View on the China threat theory 
In 1996, Xing published an article in the Communist Party journal Qiushi, entitled "Put an end to the China threat theory". He argued that the idea of a rising power threatening the existing order maintained by an established power is rooted in Western imperialism. This logic is imposed on China by the West, whose imperialism is the real cause of instability in the world. He further argued that since the United States maintains a large network of military bases far from its homeland and tries to impose its own values on other nations, it has been and will continue to be a cause of conflicts in the world.

References 

1938 births
2019 deaths
People from Jinan
People's Liberation Army generals from Shandong
Chiefs of Staff of the Lanzhou Military Region
Members of the 15th Central Committee of the Chinese Communist Party
Delegates to the 7th National People's Congress
Delegates to the 8th National People's Congress
Delegates to the 10th National People's Congress